This is a list of all hospitals in Rwanda.

Kigali City
 University Teaching Hospital of Kigali (CHUK)
 Hopital la Croix du Sud (HCS)
 Kacyiru Police Hospital 
 Muhima Hospital
 Kibagabaga Hospital
 Kanombe Military Hospital (also Rwanda Military Hospital)
 King Faisal Hospital Kigali
 Ndera Neuro-Psychiatric Teaching Hospital (Also Caraes Ndera Hospital) 
 Masaka Hospital
 Nyarugenge Hospital
 WIWO Specialized Hospital (http://wiwohospitals.com/)

Eastern Region
 Rwinkwavu Hospital
 Kirehe Hospital	
 Kibungo Hospital
 Nyagatare Hospital
 Gatunda Hospital
 Gahini Hospital
 Nyamata Hospital	
 Ngarama District Hospital
 Kiziguro Hospital
 Rwamagana Hospital

Western Region
 Shyira Hospital
 Murunda Hospital
 Kabaya Hospital
 Kibuye Hospital
 Gisenyi Hospital
 Mibilizi Hospital
 Kibogora Hospital
 Kirinda Hospital 
 Muhororo Hospital
 Gihundwe Hospital
 Bushenge Hospital
 Mugonero Hospital

Northern Region
 Ruhengeri Hospital 
 Rutongo Hospital
 Butaro Hospital
 Byumba Hospital
 Ruli Hospital
 Nemba Hospital
 Kinihira Hospital
Gatonde Hospital

Southern Region
 Kabgayi Hospital
 Kaduha Hospital
 Kibilizi Hospital
 Gitwe Hospital
 Nyabikenke Hospital
 Nyanza Hospital
 Munini Hospital
 Kigeme Hospital
 Gakoma Hospital
 Kabutare Hospital
 Remera-Rukoma Hospital
 University Teaching Hospital of Butare (CHUB)
 Ruhango Hospital

See also
 Healthcare in Rwanda

References

External links
Website of the Rwanda Ministry of Health

Rwanda
Lists of buildings and structures in Rwanda
Medical and health organisations based in Rwanda
Rwanda